Andrea Lopez (born December 7, 1977) is a Colombian actress. She is best known for her antagonistic roles in telenovelas. She is best known for her role as antagonist Mariángel Sánchez de Moncada in Zorro: La Espada y La Rosa (2007).

Filmography

Films

Television

Series 

 Decisiones(2006–2008)
 O todos en la cama (1994–1995).... Inés Mercedes Videla "La Rana"

References

Colombian film actresses
Colombian telenovela actresses
Colombian television actresses
1977 births
Living people
21st-century Colombian actresses